Tioga County is  a county in the Commonwealth of Pennsylvania. As of the 2020 census, the population was 41,045. Its county seat is Wellsboro. The county was created on March 26, 1804, from part of Lycoming County and later organized in 1812. It is named for the Tioga River.

History
The county was colonized by people of Yankee stock (colonists from New England and the western part of New York who were descended from the English Puritans of colonial New England). With the opening of a rough wagon road to the source of the Tioga River, New England colonists poured over the Allegheny Mountains. Tioga County resembled upstate New York more than it did eastern Pennsylvania, as its population primarily consisted of colonists from New England.  Developers and land speculators laid out roads, established post routes, erected public buildings, and invited people to move there.  The original colonists were entirely of New England origins or were Yankees from upstate New York, whose families had recent ancestors in New England, with colonization taking place in the aftermath of the Revolutionary War. Tioga County was largely culturally contiguous with New England culture, which was influential across the Northern Tier of the United States through its migrants.

In the late 19th and early 20th centuries, the county accepted more immigrants from Ireland, Germany and eastern Europe, who came to work in the coal mines. A number of them were Roman Catholic, introducing more diversity into the mixture of religions here.

Geography
It is the fourth-largest county in Pennsylvania by land area and fifth-largest by total area. It has a warm-summer humid continental climate (Dfb) and average monthly temperatures in Wellsboro range from 22.8 °F in January to 68.2 °F in July.

Adjacent counties
Steuben County, New York (north)
Chemung County, New York (northeast)
Bradford County (east)
Lycoming County (south)
Potter County (west)

Demographics

As of the census of 2000, there were 41,373 people, 15,925 households, and 11,195 families residing in the county.  The population density was 36 people per square mile (14/km2).  There were 19,893 housing units at an average density of 18 per square mile (7/km2).  The racial makeup of the county was 98.11% White, 0.60% Black or African American, 0.23% Native American, 0.30% Asian, 0.01% Pacific Islander, 0.14% from other races, and 0.61% from two or more races.  0.52% of the population were Hispanic or Latino of any race.  Residents of Tioga County were of 31.9% English, 23.1% German, 10.1% Irish, 6.0% Polish and 5.3% Italian ancestry.

There were 15,925 households, out of which 30.40% had children under the age of 18 living with them, 57.80% were married couples living together, 8.60% had a female householder with no husband present, and 29.70% were non-families. 24.40% of all households were made up of individuals, and 11.30% had someone living alone who was 65 years of age or older.  The average household size was 2.48 and the average family size was 2.93.

In the county, the population was spread out, with 23.70% under the age of 18, 10.60% from 18 to 24, 25.40% from 25 to 44, 24.20% from 45 to 64, and 16.00% who were 65 years of age or older.  The median age was 38 years. For every 100 females there were 95.90 males.  For every 100 females age 18 and over, there were 92.80 males.

2020 Census

Politics and government

|}

Tioga County is one of the most heavily Republican represented counties in Pennsylvania. This has a long history as Abraham Lincoln reportedly received 78.57% of the county's vote in the 1860 Presidential election. Since Abraham Lincoln the county has voted for the non-Republican presidential candidate only two times. The first was Theodore Roosevelt's 1912 run as a Progressive and the second was Lyndon B. Johnson's landslide in 1964. In 2004, George W. Bush received 12,019 votes (68%) to 5,437 votes (31%) for John Kerry. In 2008 John McCain received 62.7% of the vote. In 2006, Rick Santorum and Lynn Swann both had significant victories in Tioga County despite their defeats statewide. The last two sitting Board of Commissioners have been all Republican candidates, and Tioga County is the only county in Pennsylvania with all three sitting commissioners being from a single party. This was due to the success of write in campaigns conducted by Roger Bunn in 2011 and Mark Hamilton in 2015.

Elected officials

United States senator
 Robert "Bob" P. Casey, Jr (Democrat)
 John Fetterman (Democrat)

United States Congress
 Fred Keller (Republican) – 12th Pennsylvania Congressional District (Includes all of Tioga County).

Pennsylvania state senator
 Cris Dush – 25th District, Pennsylvania State Senate

Pennsylvania state representative
 Clint Owlett (Republican) – 68th District, Pennsylvania House of Representatives

County commissioners
 Roger C. Bunn, chair (Republican)
 Erick J. Coolidge (Republican)
 Mark L. Hamilton, vice-chair (Republican)

Court of Common Pleas judge, 4th Judicial District of Pennsylvania
 George W. Wheeler (Republican/Democrat)

Magisterial district judge
 James E. Carlson – District Court 04-3-02 (Mansfield)
 Robert Repard – District Court 04-3-02 (Wellsboro)
 James Edgecomb – District Court 04-3-01 (Elkland)

District attorney 
 Krista Deats (Republican)

Register of wills / recorder of deeds
 Jane E. Wetherbee (Republican)

Prothonotary / clerk of courts
 Marie Seymour (Republican)

County treasurer
 Kera Hackett (Republican)

Sheriff
 Frank Levindoski (Republican)

Coroner
 James L. Wilson (Republican)

Auditors
 Rebecca B. Briggs (Republican)
 Elizabeth T. Craig (Republican)
 Amy Kane Perry (Republican)

Education

Colleges and universities
Mansfield University in Mansfield is a member of the Pennsylvania State System of Higher Education.

Public school districts
Canton Area School District (also in Bradford County and Lycoming County)
Galeton Area School District (also in Potter County)
Northern Tioga School District
Southern Tioga School District (also in Lycoming County)
Wellsboro Area School District

Private schools
As reported by EdNA, Pennsylvania Department of Education, June 2010.
Covington Community DCC, Covington
Irvin Comstock Seventh-Day Adventist School, Wellsboro 	
Laurel Youth Services, Blossburg
Lauries Bright Beginnings CCC, Millerton
Mansfield Area Nursery School, Mansfield
Maranatha Mission Learning Community Branch 20, Trout Run 
New Covenant Academy,	Mansfield	
Presbyterian Child Development Center, Wellsboro
Stony Fork Mennonite School,	Wellsboro	
Trinity Lutheran School, Wellsboro	
Toddler University,	Blossburg
Toddler University,	Trinity
Wellsboro Montessori Children's Center, Wellsboro
Wesley Academy, Elkland

Public libraries
Blossburg Memorial Library
Elkland Area Community Library
Green Free Library – Wellsboro
Knoxville Public Library
Mansfield Free Public Library
Potter-Tioga County Lib System
Westfield Public Library

Transportation
Public transportation is provided by BeST Transit.

Major highways

Recreation
There are three Pennsylvania state parks in Tioga County.
Hills Creek State Park is several miles north of U.S. Route 6 between Wellsboro and Mansfield in Charleston Township.
Colton Point State Park and Leonard Harrison State Park are both part of the Pennsylvania Grand Canyon that is carved by Pine Creek.

Communities

Under Pennsylvania law, there are four types of incorporated municipalities: cities, boroughs, townships, and, in at most two cases, towns. The following boroughs and townships are located in Tioga County:

Boroughs

Blossburg
Elkland
Knoxville
Lawrenceville
Liberty
Mansfield
Roseville
Tioga
Wellsboro (county seat)
Westfield

Townships

Bloss
Brookfield
Charleston
Chatham
Clymer
Covington
Deerfield
Delmar
Duncan
Elk
Farmington
Gaines
Hamilton
Jackson
Lawrence
Liberty
Middlebury
Morris
Nelson
Osceola
Putnam
Richmond
Rutland
Shippen
Sullivan
Tioga
Union
Ward
Westfield

Census-designated places
Census-designated places are geographical areas designated by the U.S. Census Bureau for the purposes of compiling demographic data. They are not actual jurisdictions under Pennsylvania law. Other unincorporated communities, such as villages, may be listed here as well.

Arnot
Millerton

Ghost town
Fall Brook

Population ranking
The population ranking of the following table is based on the 2010 census of Tioga County.

† county seat

See also
 National Register of Historic Places listings in Tioga County, Pennsylvania

References

External links
 Tioga County, Pennsylvania
 Map 562 *Augmented by Williams, J. H., Taylor, L. E., and Low, D. J. (1993), Surficial geologic map of major glaciated valleys of Bradford, Tioga, and Potter Counties, Pennsylvania, showing locations of wells, test holes, and data-collection sites, Pennsylvania Geological Survey, 4th ser., Water Resource Report 68.

 
1812 establishments in Pennsylvania
Populated places established in 1812
Counties of Appalachia